The 1975 NCAA Division II football season, part of college football in the United States organized by the National Collegiate Athletic Association at the Division II level, began in September and concluded with the Division II Championship on December 13 at Hughes Stadium in Sacramento, California.

Northern Michigan defeated Western Kentucky in the championship game, 16–14, to win their first Division II national title.

Conference and program changes

Conference standings

Conference summaries

Postseason

The 1975 NCAA Division II Football Championship playoffs were the third single-elimination tournament to determine the national champion of NCAA Division II college football.

The four quarterfinal games were played on campus and all four host teams lost. The semifinals were the Pioneer Bowl in Wichita Falls, Texas, and the Grantland Rice Bowl in Baton Rouge, Louisiana.

The championship game was the Camellia Bowl, held at Hughes Stadium in Sacramento, California for the third and final time. The Northern Michigan Wildcats defeated the Western Kentucky Hilltoppers 16–14 to win their first national title. Of all current members of Division II, as of 2015, Northern Michigan was the first to win the playoff national championship. They went from winless (0–10) in 1974 to 13–1 and national champions in 1975, led by sophomore quarterback Steve Mariucci, later a head coach in the NFL for nine seasons.

Playoff bracket

* Denotes host institution

See also
1975 NCAA Division I football season
1975 NCAA Division III football season
1975 NAIA Division I football season
1975 NAIA Division II football season

References